The REX 6000 is an ultra-thin Personal Digital Assistant (PDA) produced by Xircom, and later Intel, from about 2000 to 2001.  Its primary claim to fame is as "The world's smallest full-function PDA", due to its unusual physical configuration as a PC card Type-II card (8.57 × 5.40 × .5 cm; 40 g). The REX may be synchronized by inserting it in a host PC's PCMCIA/PC-card slot. Docking stations were manufactured for connection to hosts without PC card Type-II slots, which allows the REX to be connected via a USB or serial connection.

The REX 6000 is the successor to the Franklin REX 5000, with a notable difference being the addition of a touch screen. In addition, it is possible to remove and install executable code (including both custom applications and the operating system itself).  As with the earlier models, the REX 6000 hardware was developed by the Citizen Watch Company of Japan, marketed as the "DataSlim-2".  The firmware for previous REX models was written by Starfish Software, but the REX 6000, though modeled on previous versions, included a complete re-write of the firmware.  

The REX 6000 does not support handwriting recognition and to enter data, a virtual keyboard is used. The standard REX 6000 has an American keyboard layout, although third-party software allows for other keyboard layouts. The pre-installed software for the Rex consists of the following:

 Calendar
 Address book
 To-do list
 Notebook
 World clock
 Calculator

Third-party software ("add-ins") include games, painting programs, spreadsheets and replacements or improvements of the pre-installed software. Most third-party software has been developed in spare time by interested users using customized versions of the Z88DK compiler or the Small Device C Compiler (SDCC).

The earliest release of the REX 6000 had 1 MB of flash memory, while later releases doubled this to 2 MB. (Earlier REXes stored user data in RAM with the operating system in ROM.) The REX has 32 KB of RAM, but only 12 KB is available for application developers. It uses a 4.3 MHz Toshiba microprocessor compatible to the Zilog Z80, has a 240 × 120 pixel monochrome LCD, and is capable of providing beep sounds to deliver alarms and reminders. The REX 6000 is powered by two button-type CR2016 lithium cells.

Around 2002 Intel acquired Xircom and subsequently discontinued this product line.

External links
The Rex 6000 Help Page (February 2012 version on the Internet Archive: The Rex 6000 Help Page)

Rex 6000 website with addins and other useful info.
Intel's official Rex 6000 page
A forum for Rex discussion

References 

Personal digital assistants
Citizen Watch